Basepoint Business Centres is a United Kingdom company that specialises in the development and operation of flexible business centres, which provide a supportive environment for small and start-up companies and under the Basepoint business model supply a range of shared facilities as well as office or workshop space all for a fixed monthly fee.

History 
Basepoint was formed in September 1988 to raise funds from the public to buy residential property to let under the assured tenancies legislation introduced by the Housing Act 1988.  In 1993 the company elected to extend its interests into commercial property and in 1995 opened its first managed business centre at Romsey, Hampshire. Further centres in the same region followed at Waterlooville, High Wycombe and Weymouth.

In June 2000 the company joined the Alternative Investment Market (AIM), and thereafter the pace of openings picked up markedly, with new centres opening in Havant in October 2000, Basingstoke in April 2001, and Folkestone, Southampton, Andover and Crawley in 2003.  2004 saw new centres open in Gosport and Bournemouth, while 2005 saw a new centre opened in Swindon and the company won a management contract for a centre in Northfleet, Kent, owned by Kent County Council.

At the end of 2005 Basepoint plc was acquired by major shareholder the ACT Foundation, a grant-making charity with a substantial portfolio of property investments, and the company was split into a development arm, Basepoint Developments Ltd, and the division responsible for the management of the centres, Basepoint Centres Ltd.  With the resources of its new parent behind it the company continued its expansion programme until by July 2011 it had 28 centres operational across the south of England and up into the Midlands, and a number of others under development, hosting well over 1,800 small businesses.

Business model
Premises are let on short-term licences that require as little as two weeks’ notice, and a single fee covers all the premises' costs apart from consumables such as communications and electricity.  Customers are typically start-ups making the first move from a spare bedroom or garage into proper business premises, small companies who would prefer to avoid the inflexibility of a long lease, and small organisations that are attracted by the support, high quality communal facilities and sense of community that all Basepoint centres offer.

The company also differentiates itself from serviced office providers in that its on-site managers act as a gateway to a wide range of support and advice, and the company's strategy is to expand this over the next few years by introducing additional support for start-up companies by establishing links with grant-making agencies, suppliers of finance, expert advisors and more.

Basepoint centres are often built in partnership with local or regional government bodies as part of regeneration and employment initiatives, with their ability to foster the development of new businesses seen as valuable in areas with below-average growth rates.

Charitable activities
Each centre is tasked to partner with a local charity and contribute money via a £-for-£ matched funding programme by The ACT Foundation, a registered charity, up to a maximum of £10,000.

References

Sources

 ACT Foundation makes offer for Basepoint
 Basepoint builds on charitable foundations
 Basepoint Business Survey Results
 Basepoint Expands
 Basepoints New Centre
 Basepoint Wins Award
 Basepoint Wins Award

External links
 

 Basepoint blog-site
 Basepoint virtual office web-site

Companies based in the City of Westminster